The Sussex County Women & Girls Football League is an association football league in England. The competition covers the county of Sussex. Founded by the Sussex Football Association in 2004. 

The league consists of three divisions; Premier, Division One and Division Two at levels 7 to 9 of the women's pyramid. It promotes to the London and South East Women's Regional Football League, and does not relegate to any league.

The League also organises its own knock-out cup competition, Sussex County Women's League Challenge Cup.

History
In early 2004 the Sussex County Football Association (SCFA) was asked by The FA to set up a women's league for the 2004–05 season. An inaugural meeting was held on 31 March 2004, chaired by the SCFA Chief Executive Ken Benham, with clubs from Brighton & Hove Albion, Crowborough Athletic, Crawley Down, Crawley Town, East Grinstead Town, Eastbourne Borough, Eastbourne Town, Hassocks, Hastings United, Haywards Heath Town, Lindfield, Seahaven Harriers and Whitehawk. A poll taken that the clubs were in favour. The league was to be managed by the SCFA council. The Sussex Girls League disbanded and the council agreed to take on the girl's section. The first Annual General Meeting of the Sussex Women & Girls Football League was held on 6 July 2004 and elected the first management committee.

On Sunday 12 September 2004 began the start of the league in Sussex with 17 adult clubs and 38 (80 teams) girl's clubs. Adults, Under 15, 14 and 13's playing as 11-a-side games also Under 14's and 13's as 9-a-side games.
The Adult league originally started as two divisions, Division One and Division Two. Although just one division ran in 2005–06 before returning to two divisions for two seasons but going back to the one division in 2008.
With the coronavirus pandemic disrupting sport throughout England, the 2019–20 and 2020–21 seasons were both abandoned. The league returned to normal for the 2021–22 season, this time running as three divisions, Premier, Division One & Division Two.

Current member clubs

Clubs competing in the 2022–23 season are:

Premier Division

Division One

Division Two

Past League Champions

2004–2021
From its formation in 2004, the league ran as just one division, apart from three seasons where a Division Two ran.

2021–Present
In 2021, Division One was renamed to Premier Division and Divisions One and Two were created

League Challenge Cup

References

External links
 Sussex County Women & Girl's League: The FA Full-Time
 SCWGFL official website

7
Football
England
Football in Sussex
Sports leagues established in 2004